Dorothea Wieck, born Dora Bertha Olavia Wieck (3 January 1908 in Davos, Switzerland – 20 February 1986 in Berlin, West Germany), was a German theatre and film  actress.

Early years
Dorothea Wieck was born Dora Bertha Olavia Wieck and grew up in southern Germany and Sweden. She was descended from musician Clara Schumann.

By the time Wieck was six years old, her father (an artist) and her mother (a musician) felt that she should be an actress. She imitated people who visited their home, and she wrote short plays for her friends and herself. She attended an academy that trained her in music, dancing, and art, but not in acting. When she was 15 years old, she began studying under Max Reinhardt and went to the Josephstaedter Theatre in Vienna, where she began to act.

Career 
Wieck launched her acting career on stage in 1924 and made her screen debut in German films in 1926, appearing in several silent films. She became widely known through her leading role in the 1931 film Mädchen in Uniform (Girls in Uniform). Her American film debut came in Cradle Song (1933).

Wieck appeared in around 50 films and played on the stages of many large theatres, notably at the Deutsches Theater and the Schillertheater, Berlin. She also worked as a theatre director. After World War II, she appeared in films only in supporting roles, and she withdrew from films almost entirely in the early 1960s. In 1973, Wieck received the Film Ribbon in Gold of the Deutscher Filmpreis for long and outstanding achievements in German film.

Personal life and death

Wieck was married to Baron Ernest von der Decken, "a man of reputed influence in the Nazi regime". During World War II, German Propaganda Minister Joseph Goebbels gave a reception at which Wieck was the guest of honor. 

DNB, the German official news agency, erroneously reported in March 1945 that Wieck had been killed in an air attack on Dresden by Allied forces. 

She actually died on 20 February 1986 in Berlin, West Germany, aged 78. She is buried at the cemetery Friedhof Heerstraße in Berlin.

Partial filmography

 Secret Sinners (1926)
 I Lost My Heart in Heidelberg (1926, directed by Arthur Bergen) - Klärchen - seine Tochter
 Little Inge and Her Three Fathers (1926) - Inge
 Klettermaxe (1927)
 Valencia (1927, directed by Jaap Speyer) - Nicolessa
 My Heidelberg, I Can Not Forget You (1927, directed by James Bauer) - Klärchen Schröder
 Storm Tide (1927)
 Did You Fall in Love Along the Beautiful Rhine? (1927) - Lieselotte, dessen Pflegeschwester
 The Foreign Legionnaire (1928) - Lore
 Mädchen in Uniform (1931, directed by Leontine Sagan) - Governess Fräulein von Bernburg
 A Mad Idea (1932, directed by Kurt Gerron) - Mabel Miller
 Teilnehmer antwortet nicht (Party Doesn't Answer) (1932, directed by Rudolf Katscher and Marc Sorkin) - Doris
 Countess Mariza (1932) - Gräfin Mariza
 Theodor Körner (1932, directed by Carl Boese) - Toni Adamberger
 Trenck (1932, directed by Heinz Paul and Ernst Neubach) - Amalie, Prinzessin von Preußen
 Anna and Elizabeth (1933, directed by Frank Wisbar) - Elisabeth
 Cradle Song (1933, directed by Mitchell Leisen) - Sister Joanna
 Miss Fane's Baby Is Stolen (1934, directed by Alexander Hall) - Miss Madeline Fane
 Der stählerne Strahl (1935) - Wiggers, Enja
 The Private Life of Louis XIV (1935, directed by Carl Froelich) - Madame de Maintenon
 The Student of Prague (1935, directed by Arthur Robison) - Julia
 The Impossible Woman (1936, directed by Johannes Meyer) - Ileana Manescu
 Love Can Lie (1937) - Sigrid Mallé
 The Yellow Flag (1937, directed by Gerhard Lamprecht) - Krankenschwester Dolores
 Der vierte kommt nicht (1939) - Dr. med. Irene Andersen
 Dein Leben gehört mir (1939)
 Kopf hoch, Johannes! (1941, directed by Viktor de Kowa)
 Andreas Schlüter (1942, directed by Herbert Maisch) - Kurfürstin
 Special Correspondents (1943) - Lidia Warren
 The Green Salon (1944, directed by Boleslaw Barlog) - Edith Retzlaff, geb. Bütow
 Leb' wohl, Christina (1945) - Julia von Gallas
 The Murder Trial of Doctor Jordan (1949, directed by Erich Engels) - Constanze Jordan
 Five Suspects (1950, directed by Kurt Hoffmann) - Frau Berling
 Das seltsame Leben des Herrn Bruggs (1951, directed by Erich Engel) - Fräulein Holder - Kunstgewerblerin
 No Greater Love (1952, directed by Harald Braun) - Therese von Gobat
 Behind Monastery Walls (1952) - Subpriorin
 Man on a Tightrope (1953, directed by Elia Kazan) - Duchess (uncredited)
 Elephant Fury (1953, directed by Harry Piel) - Hella Thiele
 The Man of My Life (1954) - Schwester Brigitte
 Der Froschkönig (1954) - Fürstin Than
 Das Fräulein von Scuderi (1955) - Frau von Maintenon
 Operation Sleeping Bag (1955) - Frau Gravenhorst
 The Forest House in Tyrol (1955) - Dorothee Attinger, Försterwitwe
 Roman einer Siebzehnjährigen  (1955) - Frau Berndorff
 The Story of Anastasia (1956, directed by Falk Harnack) - Großherzogin Olga Romanow
 A Time to Love and a Time to Die (1958, directed by Douglas Sirk) - Frau Lieser
 Aus dem Tagebuch eines Frauenarztes (1959) - Sabine Hennemann
 Menschen im Hotel (1959, directed by Gottfried Reinhardt) - Suzanne
  (1959) - Äbtissin
 Brainwashed (1960, directed by Gerd Oswald) - Countess (uncredited)
 Das Mädchen und der Staatsanwalt (1962, directed by Jürgen Goslar) - Oberin

References

Notes

External links 

 
 
 Dorothea Wieck at steffi-line.de 
 Profile at Cyranos 
 Images, filmography and bibliography at Virtual Film History
 Biography at FemBio 

1908 births
1986 deaths
People from Davos
German film actresses
German silent film actresses
German stage actresses
Actresses from Berlin
20th-century German actresses
Grand Crosses with Star and Sash of the Order of Merit of the Federal Republic of Germany
Swiss expatriates in Sweden
Swiss emigrants to Germany